Christopher Kakooza is a Roman Catholic prelate, who is the Bishop of the Roman Catholic Diocese of Lugazi, in Uganda. He was appointed to that position on 2 January 1999.

Early life and priesthood
Kakooza was born on 15 November 1952, at Nsambya Hospital. His parents lived in the neighborhood called Lusaze, in present-day Rubaga Division, in Kampala, in the Archdiocese of Kampala. He was ordained priest on 3 June 1983 at St Mbaaga's Major Seminary, Ggaba, as a member of the pioneer class at that seminary.

He was appointed Auxiliary Bishop of Roman Catholic Archdiocese of Kampala, and Titular Bishop of Casae in Numidia, on 2 January 1999.

As bishop
He was appointed bishop on 2 January 1999. He was consecrated as bishop on 17 April 1999 at Rubaga Cathedral, the seat of Kampala Archdiocese, by
Cardinal Emmanuel Wamala, Archbishop of Kampala, assisted by Bishop John Baptist Kaggwa, Bishop of Masaka and Bishop Matthias Ssekamaanya, Bishop of Lugazi.

Christoper Kakooza was appointed Bishop of Lugazi on 4 November 2014. He was installed as Bishop of Lugazi on 3 January 2015 by Bishop Cyprian Kizito Lwanga Bishop of the Archdiocese of Kampala. He succeeded Bishop Emeritus Mattias Ssekamaanya, who retired, as the Ordinary of Lugazi Diocese.

See also
 Uganda Martyrs
 Roman Catholicism in Uganda

Succession table

References

External links

Official Website of Lugazi Diocese

1952 births
Living people
21st-century Roman Catholic bishops in Uganda
People from Kampala
Roman Catholic bishops of Kampala
Roman Catholic bishops of Lugazi